ESPN NBA Basketball may refer to:

ESPN NBA Basketball (video game), a 2003 video game in the NBA 2K series
NBA on ESPN, television broadcast